Lawrencia squamata is a species of plant in the mallow family, Malvaceae.  It is endemic to Australia and occurs in all Australian states. (all mainland states)

Description
Lawrencia squamata, thorny lawrencia, or fan-leaved lawrencia,  is a spiny dioecious shrub/herb, from 0.02 to 1.5 m high. The leaves are scaly and not  lobed, 10 to 40 mm long and 5 to 20 mm wide, with peltate scales.  The flowers have both a calyx and a corolla, with the corolla being yellow, white, red or purple,. The flowers are axillary. They are seen between August to January in WA, May to November in SA, September to November in Victoria. The stamens are many and united.

Habitat
It grows on clayey soils, and is found fringing saltlakes and salty depressions.

Taxonomy
Lawrencia squamata was first described by Nees von Esenbeck in 1845.

References

squamata
Flora of Western Australia
Flora of South Australia
Flora of the Northern Territory
Flora of Queensland
Flora of New South Wales
Flora of Victoria (Australia)
Flora of Tasmania
Dioecious plants